Didier Artzet (born 10 February 1963 in Nice) is a French former racing driver.

References

1963 births
Living people
French racing drivers
International Formula 3000 drivers
24 Hours of Le Mans drivers
World Sportscar Championship drivers
24 Hours of Spa drivers
Sportspeople from Nice
20th-century French people

TOM'S drivers